Huddersfield Town's 1922–23 campaign saw Town finish in their highest position since their inception 15 years earlier. In only their third season in top-flight football, they finished in 3rd place behind Liverpool and Sunderland. This was another good season following on from their FA Cup triumph the previous season.

Squad at the start of the season

Review
Following the success at Stamford Bridge in the previous season's FA Cup Final, many were hoping that this newfound form would transfer itself into a successful league campaign and even a possible chance of the 1st Division title. However, Town had a bad start, only winning 2 of their first 10 games. So Herbert Chapman brought in Charlie Wilson from Tottenham Hotspur. His 13 goals helped Town mount a charge up the table along with the goals of Ernie Islip, Billy Smith and Frank Mann. They would eventually finish only 7 points behind defending champions Liverpool.

Squad at the end of the season

Results

Division One

FA Cup

Appearances and goals

Huddersfield Town A.F.C. seasons
Huddersfield Town F.C.